Augustin Pax "Coco" Deleanu (23 August 1944 – 27 March 2014) was a Romanian footballer, who played as a left back.

Club career
Augustin Pax Deleanu, nicknamed "Coco" was born on 23 August 1944 in Măgurele, Romania and started to play football at the junior squads of Steaua București. He made his Divizia A debut on 24 November 1963, playing for Politehnica Iași in a 1–0 victory against Petrolul Ploiești. He spent 6 seasons at Politehnica, a period in which the club had a relegation to Divizia B, but he helped the club gain the promotion back to Divizia A after one season and in 1968 he went to play for Dinamo București. He spent 7 seasons with The Red Dogs, winning three Divizia A titles with the club, at the first he contributed with 3 goals scored in 27 matches, in the second he played 23 games without scoring and in the third he made 34 appearances and scored one goal, also appearing in 16 matches in European competitions (including 4 appearances in the Inter-Cities Fairs Cup). Deleanu ended his career by spending one season at Jiul Petroșani, making his last Divizia A appearance on 30 June 1977 in a 2–0 loss against Universitatea Craiova, having a total of 325 matches played and 18 goals scored in the competition. After his retirement, Deleanu had different administration positions at Dinamo București, between 1990–1994 being the vice-president of the club. Augustin Deleanu died on 27 March 2014 at age 69 in the Floreasca Hospital from Bucharest.

International career
Augustin Deleanu played 25 games without scoring for Romania, making his debut on 26 November 1966 under coach Ilie Oană in a 3–1 loss against Italy at the 1968 Euro qualifiers, where he would also make his second appearance for the national team in a 5–1 victory against Cyprus. He played four games at the successful 1970 World Cup qualifiers, being selected by coach Angelo Niculescu to be part of the squad for the final tournament where he did not play. He played 5 matches at the 1972 Euro qualifiers, managing to reach the quarter-finals where Romania was defeated by Hungary, who advanced to the final tournament. Augustin Deleanu played a total of five matches at the 1974 World Cup qualifiers, including his last appearance for the national team which took place on 14 October 1973 in Romania's biggest ever victory, a 9–0 against Finland.

For representing his country at the 1970 World Cup, Deleanu was decorated by President of Romania Traian Băsescu on 25 March 2008 with the Ordinul "Meritul Sportiv" – (The Medal "The Sportive Merit") class III.

Honours
Politehnica Iași
Divizia B: 1967–68
Dinamo București
Divizia A: 1970–71, 1972–73, 1974–75
Cupa României: runner-up 1969–70, 1970–71

References

External links

1944 births
2014 deaths
Romanian footballers
Romania international footballers
People from Măgurele
Association football defenders
Liga I players
Liga II players
1970 FIFA World Cup players
FC Steaua București players
FC Politehnica Iași (1945) players
FC Dinamo București players
CSM Jiul Petroșani players
Romanian sports executives and administrators